This is a list of events held and scheduled by the Road Fighting Championship (Road FC), a mixed martial arts promotion based in the South Korea. Road FC's first event, Road FC 001: The Resurrection of Champions, took place on October 23, 2010. Each Road FC event contains several fights. Traditionally, every event starts off with a preliminary card (young guns series) followed by a main card, with the last fight being known as the main event.

Past events

Number of events by year 
As of Road FC 057 x Road FC XX.

See also 

 List of Road FC champions
 List of current Road FC fighters

References

External links

Road FC